The following lists events in the year 2017 in Israel.

Incumbents
 President – Reuven Rivlin
 Prime Minister – Benjamin Netanyahu
 Government of Israel – 34th government of Israel
 President of the Supreme Court – Miriam Naor until 26 October, Esther Hayut
 Chief of General Staff – Gadi Eizenkot

Events

January
 January 8 – Jerusalem vehicular attack

February
 February 6 – The Knesset passed the Regulation Law 60 to 52

March
 March 15 – Israel finished in 6th place at the 2017 World Baseball Classic
 March 17 – Israel–Syria incident

April
 April 14 – Jerusalem Light Rail stabbing

May
 13 May – Imri Ziv represents Israel at the Eurovision Song Contest with the song “I Feel Alive”.
 15 May – Launching of Israeli Broadcasting Corporation with stations KAN 11 and Makan 33
 22 May – Donald Trump the President of the United States visits the Western Wall
 24 May – Celebration of the 50th Jerusalem Day

June
 June 4 – Opening of the Assuta Ashdod Medical Center
 June 16 – Jerusalem attack
 June 24 – Kick off of the 2017 Israeli Basketball Super League Final Four

July
 4–17 July – The 20th Maccabiah Games are held with 10,000 athletes from Israel and Jewish communities throughout the world competing in 45 sports.
 July 14 – Temple Mount shooting
 July 21 – Halamish stabbing attack
 July 23 – Israeli embassy in Amman attack

August
 August 2 – 2017 Yavne attack
 August 19 – Israel at the 2017 Summer Universiade began
 August 31 – Israel hosted the EuroBasket 2017 Group B

December
 December 6 – The White House announces that Donald Trump will officially recognize Jerusalem as the capital of Israel.

Deaths
 January 1 – Yaakov Neeman (born 1939), lawyer and politician, former Minister of Justice and Minister of Finance
 January 13 – Ari Rath (born 1925), journalist and editor, former editor of The Jerusalem Post
 January 22 – Moshe Gershuni (born 1936), painter and sculptor
 February 5 – Gila Goldstein (born 1947), actress, singer and activist
 March 2 – David Rubinger (born 1924), photographer who took a famous photograph of Israeli Paratroopers at the Western Wall
 March 24 – Avraham Sharir (born 1932), politician and government minister
 May 1 – Yisrael Friedman (born 1923), Romanian-born Israeli rabbi
 July 23 - Amir Fryszer Guttman (born 1976) Singer and Gay rights activist died while saving his niece from drowning.

References

See also

 2017 in the Palestinian territories
 List of violent incidents in the Israeli–Palestinian conflict, 2017

 
2010s in Israel
Israel
Israel
Years of the 21st century in Israel